Cnaemidophorus smithi is a species of moth in the genus Cnaemidophorus known from Colombia. Moths in this species take flight in June, and have a wingspan of approximately 18 millimetres.

References

Platyptiliini
Moths described in 1992
Taxa named by Cees Gielis